The 1975-76 Penn State Nittany Lions men's basketball team represented the Pennsylvania State University during the 1975-76 NCAA Division I men's basketball season. The team was led by 8th-year head coach Johnny Bach, and played their home games at Rec Hall in University Park, Pennsylvania.

Schedule

Source

References

Penn State Nittany Lions basketball seasons
Penn State
1975 in sports in Pennsylvania
1976 in sports in Pennsylvania